Eleanor May Tomlinson (born 19 May 1992) is an English actress and singer. She has appeared in films including Angus, Thongs and Perfect Snogging (2008), Jack the Giant Slayer (2013), Colette (2018) and Love Wedding Repeat (2020). She also starred in the BBC One series Poldark (2015–2019) and The Outlaws (2021).

Early life and family
Tomlinson was born in London, England. She and her family moved to Beverley, East Riding of Yorkshire, when she was young and she attended Beverley High School. She is the daughter of Judith Hibbert, a singer, and Malcolm Tomlinson, an actor and horse racing commentator. Her brother, Ross Tomlinson, is also an actor.

Career
In 2006, Tomlinson appeared in The Illusionist as Young Sophie. She starred in the teen film Angus, Thongs and Perfect Snogging in 2008, in which she plays Jas. She played Kirsten in the 2009 Pro Sieben international production Hepzibah – Sie holt dich im Schlaf alongside David Bamber, under the direction of Robert Sigl.

She went on to play Eve, an alien, in "The Mad Woman in the Attic"—episodes three and four of Series 3 of The Sarah Jane Adventures—in 2009, and Fiona Chataway in the film Alice in Wonderland, which premiered in theatres on 5 March 2010. In 2013 she was Xenya in the film Siberian Education by Gabriele Salvatores.

After an extensive search, she was cast as Princess Isabelle in Jack the Giant Slayer (2013), directed by Bryan Singer. She also appeared in the Agatha Christie's Poirot episode "The Labours of Hercules" (2013) as Alice Cunningham.

In 2013 she starred in the TV series The White Queen, as Lady Isabel Neville and as Georgiana Darcy in the BBC adaptation of Death Comes to Pemberley. Between 2015 and 2019, she played Demelza Poldark in the BBC One television series Poldark.

Tomlinson was #56 on the "Radio Times TV 100" list for 2018, a list said to be determined by television executives and broadcasting veterans.

She starred in the 2019 BBC television series The War of the Worlds—based on the H.G. Wells novel of the same name—playing Amy, a role expanded from that of the wife of the book's narrator. In 2021 she played Lady Gabby in Stephen Merchant and Elgin James' comedy drama for BBC television, The Outlaws. In July 2022 it was revealed that she had joined the cast of Netflix's romantic drama series "One Day".

Personal life
In July 2022, Tomlinson married rugby player Will Owen.

Filmography

Film

Television

References

External links

 
 
 

1992 births
Living people
Actresses from London
Actresses from Yorkshire
People from Beverley
English child actresses
English film actresses
English television actresses
English female models
21st-century English actresses
English voice actresses
English video game actresses